The ALCO RSD-1 was a diesel-electric locomotive built by the American Locomotive Company (ALCO). It was often used in much the same manner as its four-axle counterpart, the ALCO RS-1, though the six-motor design allowed better tractive effort at lower speeds, as well as a lower weight-per-axle. It was developed to meet the need to supply the Soviet Union over the Trans-Iranian Railway starting in mid 1943. On the other hand, due to the traction generator and appurtenant control apparatus being sized for four axles and yet having two additional powered axles, it had poorer performance at higher speeds.

Variations
There were three different specifications issued that covered the RSD-1 model; E1645 and E1646 were for wartime production for the US Army, while E1647 was a post-war order for the Mexican National Railways (Ferrocarriles Nacionales de México).

Soviet Union

Alco locos
Seventy of the RSD-1s were shipped overseas to the Soviet Union in early 1945 during World War II, as part of the Allied war effort. They were classed there as the Soviet Railways ДA20 (DA20) class, also known just as ДА after 1947 (D for Diesel, A for Alco and 20 for axle load in tons). They were used in ordinary line service rather than shunting, especially in southern parts of the Soviet Union (Turkmenistan), where water for steam locomotives was scarce. These locomotives were also used on the Trans-Iranian Railway. The Soviets subsequently kept many of the RSD-1s after the war, adopting the design to form the basis of their own line of diesel locomotives TE1, TEM1 and TEM2. Two RSD-1s were sunk en route to the Soviet Union when the ship they were on was torpedoed by a German U-boat (ДA20-41 and ДA20-50) and 68  were received. They entered service from March 1945, and some were still in service in the 1980s. The DA20-27 hauled Stalin's train to Potsdam Conference, and its positive evaluation was among reasons to copy the design (the Soviet Union built only 51 diesel locomotives before the war, so it had not enough experience with designing).

Soviet locos

The Soviet-built TE1 (ТЭ1), initially designed TE1-20, was a reverse engineered copy  of the Alco product, adapted to metric system and Soviet norms. They were almost identical, but locomotives after #TE1-20-122 had 1050 mm (41.34 inch), instead of 40 inch wheels (1016 mm). The designation meant T - teplovoz (diesel engine), E - electric transmission, model 1, 20 ton axle load. A production lasted from 1947 until 1950 and 300 were made (including 2 of TE5 class). The TE2 (ТЭ2) utilized engine and electric components of TE1, but was as a twin-unit version, with a wagon-type body and utilized two-axle bogies. The TE5 (ТЭ5) was a cold climate version of the TE1. The cab was extended for most of the locomotive to provide covered access to the engine and a boiler was added to keep the cab warm when the engine was not running.
 Only two (or five) TE5 were built, within TE1 series.

US Army
The first 13 RS-1s were requisitioned by the US Army, returned to ALCO and rebuilt to RSD-1s #8000-8012 for use on the Trans Iranian Railroad. This effort was to supply the Soviet Union. See the RS-1 article for the identity of the first 13 RSD-1s.

Original owners

Specification E1645

Specification E1646

Specification E1647

References

External links

 ALCo World: The Russian RSD-1 Copies
Another RSD-1 roster with build dates http://www.thedieselshop.us/Alco_RSD1.HTML 

C-C locomotives
RSD-1
United States Army locomotives
Diesel-electric locomotives of the United States
Railway locomotives introduced in 1942
Standard gauge locomotives of the United States
5 ft gauge locomotives
Standard gauge locomotives of Mexico
Diesel-electric locomotives of the Soviet Union
Diesel-electric locomotives of Mexico